SMS Dresden was the second and final ship of the  of light cruisers to be completed and commissioned in the Kaiserliche Marine. The ship was laid down in 1916 and launched on 25 April 1917; she was commissioned into the High Seas Fleet on 28 March 1918. She and her sister  were the only two of her class to be completed; eight of her sisters were scrapped before they could be completed. The ships were an incremental improvement over the preceding  cruisers.

Dresden was commissioned into service with the High Seas Fleet eight months before the end of World War I; as a result, her service career was limited and she did not see action. She participated in a fleet operation to Norway to attack British convoys to Scandinavia, but they failed to locate any convoys and returned to port. Dresden was to have participated in a climactic sortie in the final days of the war, but a revolt in the fleet forced Admirals Reinhard Scheer and Franz von Hipper to cancel the operation. The ship was interned in Scapa Flow after the end of the war and scuttled with the fleet there on 21 June 1919, under orders from the fleet commander Rear Admiral Ludwig von Reuter.

Design

Her propulsion system consisted of two sets of steam turbines, which drove a pair of screw propellers. Steam was provided by eight coal-fired and six oil-fired Marine-type water-tube boilers. The boilers were ducted into three funnels amidships. The crew complement consisted of 17 officers and 542 enlisted men.

The ship was armed with eight  SK L/45 guns in single pedestal mounts. Two were placed side by side forward on the forecastle, four were located amidships, two on either side, and two were arranged in a super firing pair aft. They were supplied with 1,040 rounds of ammunition, for 130 shells per gun. Dresden also carried three  SK L/45 anti-aircraft guns mounted on the centerline astern of the funnels, though one was removed in 1918. She was also equipped with a pair of  torpedo tubes with eight torpedoes in deck-mounted swivel launchers amidships. She also carried 200 mines.

Service history
Dresden was ordered under the contract name "Ersatz " and was laid down at the Blohm & Voss shipyard in Hamburg in 1916. She was launched on 25 April 1917, after which fitting-out work commenced. She was commissioned into the High Seas Fleet on 28 March 1918. After her commissioning, Dresden joined the reconnaissance screen for the High Seas Fleet. She was the last light cruiser built by the Kaiserliche Marine.

The ships were in service in time for the major fleet operation to Norway in 23–24 April 1918. I Scouting Group and II Scouting Group, along with the Second Torpedo-Boat Flotilla, were to attack a heavily guarded British convoy to Norway, with the rest of the High Seas Fleet steaming in support. The Germans failed to locate the convoy, which had in fact sailed the day before the fleet left port. As a result, Admiral Reinhard Scheer broke off the operation and returned to port.

In October 1918, Dresden and the rest of II Scouting Group were to lead a final attack on the British navy. Dresden, Cöln, Pillau, and Königsberg were to attack merchant shipping in the Thames estuary while the rest of the Group were to bombard targets in Flanders, to draw out the British Grand Fleet. Scheer intended to inflict as much damage as possible on the British navy, in order to secure a better bargaining position for Germany, whatever the cost to the fleet. On the morning of 29 October 1918, the order was given to sail from Wilhelmshaven the following day. The unrest ultimately forced Hipper and Scheer to cancel the operation.

During the sailors' revolt, Dresden was ordered to steam to Eckernförde to serve as a relay to Kiel. Communications had been disrupted by major unrest there. The battleship  laid in Dresdens path, and her unruly crew refused to move out of Dresdens way; Markgraf aimed one of her  gun turrets at Dresden, but then her crew backed down and let Dresden leave the port. The ship then went to Swinemünde, where her crew partially scuttled her following reports that mutinous ships were en route to attack the cruisers stationed there. After these proved false, Dresden was re-floated and returned to seaworthy condition. This involved removing the ammunition for all of the guns and allowing them to air-dry. Following the capitulation of Germany in November 1918, most of the High Seas Fleet's ships, under the command of Rear Admiral Ludwig von Reuter, were interned in the British naval base in Scapa Flow. Dresden was among the ships interned, but owing to the ship's poor condition following the naval mutiny, she was not able to steam with the rest of the fleet in November. Dresden arrived on 6 December, leaking badly.

The fleet remained in captivity during the negotiations that ultimately produced the Versailles Treaty. Von Reuter believed that the British intended to seize the German ships on 21 June 1919, which was the deadline for Germany to have signed the peace treaty. Unaware that the deadline had been extended to the 23rd, Reuter ordered the ships to be sunk at the next opportunity. On the morning of 21 June, the British fleet left Scapa Flow to conduct training maneuvers, and at 11:20 Reuter transmitted the order to his ships. Dresden began to sink at 13:50. The upper decks have been badly damaged and the weather deck has separated from the hull, exposing her internal structure. The main guns are buried in mud. In 2017, marine archaeologists from the Orkney Research Center for Archaeology conducted extensive surveys of Dresden and nine other wrecks in the area, including six other German and three British warships. The archaeologists mapped the wrecks with sonar and examined them with remotely operated underwater vehicles as part of an effort to determine how the wrecks are deteriorating.

Notes

References

Further reading
 
 

Cöln-class cruisers
Ships built in Kiel
1917 ships
World War I cruisers of Germany
World War I warships scuttled at Scapa Flow
Maritime incidents in 1919
Wreck diving sites in Scotland